The Morality of Mrs. Dulska (Polish: Moralność pani Dulskiej) is a 1930 Polish film, directed by Bolesław Newolin based on the play by Gabriela Zapolska under the same title. It was the first Polish sound film. The dialogues were recorded on vinyl records that were lost, so the film is currently silent.

Plot 
The action of the film takes place in Warsaw (not in Lviv like in the original play) at the beginning of the 20th century. The Dulski family welcomes a new servant - Hanka. The girl falls in love with their son Zbyszek. The young people have an affair which results in an illegitimate child. Zbyszek wants to marry the girl but meets the resistance of his parents.

Cast 
 Dela Lipińska (Hanka)
 Marta Flantz (Aniela Dulska)
 Ludwik Fritsche (Felicjan Dulski)
 Tadeusz Wesołowski (Dulski Zbyszko)
 Juliusz Lubicz-Lisowski (Antek)
 Maria Chaveau (Juliasiewiczowa)
 Anna Daszyńska (Mela)
 Zofia Batycka (actress)
 Adolf Dymsza (constable)
 Roman Dereń (watchman)
 Helena Sokołowska (Zofia Madrygał, fiancée's mother)
 Janina Modzelewska (Tadrachowa)
 Stanisława Kamińska (Marysia)
 Jan Szymański (Tadrach, old villager)
 Krystyna Ankwicz

References

External links 

1930 films
Polish drama films
Polish films based on plays